Belgium was represented by Bob Benny, with the song '"Hou toch van mij", at the 1959 Eurovision Song Contest, which took place on 11 March in Cannes, France. The song was chosen at the Belgian national final on 15 February. Benny would represent Belgium again in the 1961 contest.

Before Eurovision

Grote Prijs van het Eurovisielied 
Grote Prijs van het Eurovisielied was the national final format developed by NIR in order to select Belgium's entry for the Eurovision Song Contest 1959. Eighteen entries competed in the competition that consisted of two semi-finals held on 1 and 8 February 1959 leading to a two-song final on 15 February 1959. All three shows were hosted by Jan Theys.

Format 
The format of the competition consisted of three shows: two semi-finals on 1 and 8 February 1959 and the final on 15 February 1959. Each semi-final featured nine competing entries from which one advanced from each show to complete the two song lineup in the final. Results during both semi-finals and final were determined by "expert" jury.

Competing entries 
Nine composers were approached by NIR to create the songs for the contest. Each composers wrote two songs for the contest. Then, NIR selected performers for the songs.

Semi-final 1
The first semi-final took place on 1 February 1959 at the Funkis Cinema in Herentals.

Semi-final 2
The second semi-final took place on 8 February 1959 at the Apollo in Antwerp.

Final
The final was held on 15 February 1959 at 21:25 CET as part of NIR's TV show Show Band Show at the Cultural and Artistic Center in Ukkel and hosted by Jan Theys. The song "Hou toch van mij" written by Ke Riema, composed by Hans Flower and performed by Bob Benny, was selected as the winner of selection by an "expert" jury.

At Eurovision 
On the night of the final Bob Benny performed last in the running order, following the United Kingdom. Voting was by 10-member national juries with each member awarding 1 point to his/her favourite song. At the close of the voting "Hou Toch Van Mij" had received 9 points (3 from Germany, 2 from Denmark and the United Kingdom and 1 from Monaco and the Netherlands), placing Belgium joint 6th (with Italy) of the 11 entries.

Voting

References

External links
 Official Eurovision Song Contest site, history by year, 1959.
 Detailed info and lyrics, Diggiloo Thrush, "Hou toch van mij".

1959
Countries in the Eurovision Song Contest 1959
Eurovision